Moreno Trevisiol (born 29 April 1963 in Treviso) is a former Italian rugby union player and coach, and a current sports manager. He played as a hooker.

Trevisiol did all his career at Benetton Treviso, from 1981/82 to 1998/99. He won 6 titles of the Italian Championship, in 1982/83, 1988/89, 1991/92, 1996/97, 1997/98 and 1998/99, and the Cup of Italy, in 1997/98.

He had 8 caps for Italy, from 1988 to 1994, without scoring. He was called for the 1995 Rugby World Cup, but didn't play.

After finishing his player career, he became a coach, being in charge of Riviera (2004/05), Venezia Mestre (2005/06-2006/07) and once again Riviera (2007/08 and early 2008/09). He was sacked due to bad results in October 2008.

He was elected federal counselor of the Italian Rugby Federation in 2004, being reelected in 2008.

References

External links
Moreno Trevisiol International Statistics

1963 births
Living people
Italian rugby union players
Italy international rugby union players
Italian rugby union coaches
Benetton Rugby players
Rugby union hookers